Bruno Johannes Bruins (born 10 July 1963) is a Dutch politician of the People's Party for Freedom and Democracy (VVD) who served as Minister for Medical Care in the Third Rutte cabinet from 26 October 2017 to 19 March 2020, when he resigned. He previously served as State Secretary for Education, Culture and Science from 29 June 2006 until 22 February 2007 in the Second and Third Balkenende cabinets.

Bruins also served as Acting Mayor of Leidschendam-Voorburg from 22 February 2007 until 1 November 2007. He worked as a Corporate director for the public transport company Connexxion from 1 September 2008 until 1 August 2011 and was Chairman of the Employee Insurance association from 1 January 2012 until 26 October 2017.

After the general election of 2017 Bruins was appointed as Minister for Medical Care in the Third Rutte cabinet. During his time in office, he led the initial phase of the Dutch government's fight against the COVID-19 pandemic. He resigned in March 2020 after collapsing from exhaustion during a parliamentary debate on the pandemic.

In 2020, Bruins was appointed acting managing director of HTM Personenvervoer.

Decorations

References

External links

Official
  Mr.Drs. B.J. (Bruno) Bruins Parlement & Politiek

 

 
 

 

 
 

1963 births
Living people
Aldermen of The Hague
Dutch corporate directors
Dutch nonprofit executives
Dutch nonprofit directors
Dutch trade association executives
Knights of the Order of Orange-Nassau
Mayors in South Holland
People from Leidschendam-Voorburg
People from Arnhem
People's Party for Freedom and Democracy politicians
State Secretaries for Education of the Netherlands
Ministers of Sport of the Netherlands
Ministers without portfolio of the Netherlands
Municipal councillors of The Hague
University of Groningen alumni
20th-century Dutch businesspeople
20th-century Dutch civil servants
20th-century Dutch politicians
21st-century Dutch businesspeople
21st-century Dutch civil servants
21st-century Dutch politicians